Mamoudou is a given name. Notable people with the name include:

Mamoudou Athie (born 1988), American actor
Mamoudou Hanne (born 1988), French, former Malian, sprint athlete
Mamoudou Kondo (born 1990), Malian footballer
Mamoudou Mara (born 1990), Guinean footballer
Mamoudou Sy (born 1983), French basketball player